Frantsishak Alyakhnovich (March 9, 1883 in Vilnius – March 3, 1944 in Vilnius,  (also Аляхнoвичъ, Франц Олехнович)) was a Belarusian writer, journalist descended from the Ruthenian nobility.

Alyakhnovich was a theatrical writer, director and journalist in West Belarus. He was editor of the newspaper Беларускі звон (Biełaruski zvon) published in Vilnius.

In 1926 he decided to stay in East Belarus after a conference in Minsk. Several months later he was arrested by the GPU and sent to Solovki prison camp. He spent seven years in the Gulag and only in 1933 was he exchanged for Branislaw Tarashkyevich, a West Belarusian politician and linguist held in a Polish prison.

Alyakhnovich's Gulag experience became a basis for his 1934 book of memoirs У капцюрох ГПУ (U kapciuroch HPU, In the claws of the GPU), that was later translated into several languages.

During the Second World War, Alyakhnovich collaborated with Nazi Germany and was editor of the newspaper Беларускі голас (Biełaruski hołas, Belarusian voice) published in Vilnius. Apart from that, he was also one of the leaders of the Belarusian Independence Party - an illegal and underground Belarusian nationalist organization led by Fr. Vincent Hadleŭski.

In 1944, Frantsishak Alyakhnovich was assassinated.

References

1883 births
1944 deaths
Writers from Vilnius
People from Vilensky Uyezd
Belarusian Independence Party politicians
Belarusian dramatists and playwrights
Belarusian journalists
Male dramatists and playwrights
Belarusian male writers
Male journalists
20th-century dramatists and playwrights
20th-century male writers
20th-century journalists
Belarusian collaborators with Nazi Germany
Foreign Gulag detainees
Burials at Rasos Cemetery